X-COM: Apocalypse is a 1997 science fiction tactical strategy game. It is the third game in the X-COM video game series. It was developed by Mythos Games (the creators of the original X-COM game), and published by MicroProse in 1997 for DOS and Microsoft Windows.

Gameplay
Similar to the first two X-COM games, Apocalypse features a map-like management mode (the Cityscape) and an isometric combat mode (the Battlescape). The management mode takes place in a single city, called Mega Primus, rather than being spread out over the entire planet Earth as in the previous games. In addition, Apocalypse was the first game in the X-COM series to include a real-time combat option as well as the traditional turn-based mode.

Apocalypse features a re-done interface with new graphics. It is more complex, and the task of keeping and increasing the funding of the X-COM organization now extends to not only intercepting UFOs, but also to minimizing collateral damage, preventing alien hostile takeovers and even raiding the buildings of other organisations, of which there are several in Mega Primus.

X-COM: Apocalypse claims to have a self-learning AI-module. The game does feature self-adjusting difficulty, where player performances influences the Alien zeal to expand and infest. Sluggish X-COM responses, total failures, and a bad weekly rating slow the alien build-up of weapons and creatures (but not ships) on their homeworld. This gives the player the chance to amend their failures and rethink their strategy. For example, a high rating in first five days can make the Aliens attack the player's HQ head-on with a large heavily armed mob often. Conversely, a low rating in the first five days can make the aliens only occur twice a week, with a very small force. This also affects the equipment quality of the aliens, so if a very high score is acquired quickly (for example by using a bug that allows the player to raid allied organisations without hostile response), the very first batch of aliens might be found with personal shields and disruptor cannons (which normally would appear only much later in the game).

Mega-Primus
The city is run by 13 elected senators. Large corporations maintain the environmental, social and economic structure of the city, while the populace live in relative comfort. Mega-Primus has its own marginalized minorities, consisting of Sectoid-human hybrids and androids, both by-products of the previous wars. These minorities have set up their own political pressure groups. When the aliens invade, the city government reestablishes X-COM. This time there is no absolute support by world/city governments. Mega-Primus has its own governing body who supply nearly all of X-COM's income. X-COM would have to support its income through the sale of alien artifacts captured from missions, and items manufactured in their own workshops.

X-COM must maintain a good rapport with other organizations in the city. If X-COM angers any of them, or fails to contain the alien incursion, organizations will demand compensation or even actively attack X-COM forces. They will also withdraw their support (if any) for the X-COM project. For example, the Transtellar organization would prevent Agents and science personnel from travelling around the city. The corporations and political organizations will make profits, perform research, manufacture items, and even fight covert battles with one another independently of the player. For example, if Megapol, the city police, are making much money, they will be able to maintain a strong presence in the city, attacking alien ships and other hostile aircraft. The more damage to the city, and the greater Megapol's financial trouble, the less they will be able to respond to enemy attacks across the city. One of these organizations, the Cult of Sirius, is a group of religious fanatics who worship the aliens, and is inherently hostile to X-COM. The aliens, rather than simply signing non-aggression treaties with the various corporations, will attempt to infest their CEOs and take control of the organizations themselves.

If the Government becomes hostile towards X-COM for any reason, such as alien interference or excessive damage to Government property and personnel, then the X-COM project will receive no further funding. This is a potential disaster for the player, and can lead to X-COM scrounging out a miserable existence, stealing from other organisations to survive. However, with perfect management, X-COM can overpower the entire City's military, while being richer than even Food Monopoly Company Nutrivend, then destroy the whole city and get away with it. Having friendly relations with both minorities (the android organisation S.E.L.F and the hybrid Mutant Alliance) can result in talented recruits of these races becoming available in following weeks.

Plot
Half a century after the end of the second X-COM campaign, the last battle of T'leth has severely damaged Earth's biosphere. As a result, several self-contained Megalopolis-type cities were proposed to provide habitation for humanity. The game follows Mega-Primus, the first of these cities, built over the ruins of Toronto, Canada. Meanwhile, the off-world colony of Mars is exploited by the Elerium mining corporation, Solmine, and oppressed by MarSec (MARs SECurity).

The alien threat in the game is presented by a new race of organic, extradimensional aliens that initially seem to have no relation to the aliens of the previous two games, though later missions set in the aliens' home dimension reveal they have enslaved Sectoid survivors. These new aliens attack the city through tetrahedron-shaped teleport gates. The player must find out how to send their own aircraft, along with X-COM agents, through these gates without being destroyed and take the war to the aliens. Apocalypse has 14 races of alien beings including Anthropods, Brainsuckers, Hyperworms, Megaspawns, and Micronoids. Each race has various strengths and weaknesses, and some races are dependent on other races. The "alien life cycle" plays a crucial role in the game.

The player is exposed to this "alien life cycle" through research and more importantly the lower level alien attacks during specimen gathering combat. Primarily the attack of the weaponized alien the Brain-Sucker which attacks individuals after landing from a pod launcher used by alien foot soldiers. The Brain-Sucker hatches and attacks the nearest individual by jumping on their head and seemingly injecting something into them through the mouth and dying immediately after the attempt.

The life cycle later takes a mysterious turn as it shows no connection between the lower alien forms and higher alien forms. Eventually, however, it is found that the leaders of the invasion are the Micronoids, a race of sapient, single-celled organisms that live in the bloodstreams of the other aliens. The ultimate goal of the invasion is to inject Micronoids into the bloodstreams of important figures, allowing them to control Mega-Primus through psionic domination of their hosts. The player is eventually tasked with invading the aliens' homeworld and destroying their side of the gate to stop the Micronoid infestation.

Development
During the creation of Apocalypse, Mythos Games created the game but MicroProse wanted to create the graphics. Julian Gollop called the relationship "disastrous", and said of the game "It was a disaster area. Apocalypse was quite a sophisticated and ambitious game, but it was a big mistake from our point of view. In retrospect, we should have originally agreed to do a sequel in six months, and spent a year doing it, like they did! It would've been a lot better." Gollop recollected:

Artist Terry Greer recalled: "My main memory of Apocalypse was the pain we all went through. It was a hugely ambitious project and used a mix of rendered and hand drawn artwork from a variety of graphic styles (which didn't always work – although all the individual bits were great). Probably the worst fit was Tim White (an established SF artist) who had been commissioned to do the character designs. I like Tim's work, but his models were intensely detailed and quite unsuitable for reducing to the scale needed for an isometric game of this type. The creatures he designed looked great full screen, but reduced to the size they would be ingame they were often unrecognizable blobs. I don't know the reasons behind the decision to hire him, only that the problems were apparent to everyone in the art department, and I would have loved to have seen them ditched."

Release
X-COM: Apocalypse was originally released in the U.S. on July 15, 1997. It was re-released as part of the compilations X-COM Collection by Hasbro Interactive in 1999, and X-COM: Complete Pack in 2008 and 2K Huge Games Pack in 2009 by 2K Games. On September 5, 2008, the X-COM series, including X-COM Apocalypse, became available for sale on Valve's Steam platform; the game runs in a specially configured version of DOSBox.

Reception

Reviews
The game received favorable reviews. Next Generation said, "In the end, Apocalypse is a step in the right direction, but a step with a wobble. With better control over the cityscape, and more distinct atmosphere and character, it would have been a smash. As it is, it's enjoyable, and well-worth the investment in money and time, but not what it could have been."

Despite the troubled development, Apocalypse was well received. GameSpot included it on their 2000 list of the most disappointing endings, criticizing the game for its "colorful, almost humorous tone," but added that otherwise the designers "did a great job."

Sales
The game debuted at No. 6 on PC Data's computer game sales chart for the month of July 1997. It secured 18th place the following month. By July 23, the game had shipped 120,000 units to retailers globally. Market research firm SofTrends estimated sell-through of 32,812 units during July alone.

Awards
The game won the award for "Turn-based Strategy" at PC PowerPlays 1997 Game of the Year Awards.

Open-source remake
In 2014 a group of developers formed to remake the game from scratch in C++, under the OpenApoc title. By 2018 the remake had reached an Alpha release state with the entire game playable from start to end and a growing community of developers and players.

References

Further reading

External links 
 via Internet Archive

X-COM: Apocalypse at UFOpaedia

1997 video games
Alien invasions in video games
Android (robot) video games
DOS games
Games commercially released with DOSBox
MicroProse games
Real-time tactics video games
Science fiction video games
Single-player video games
Turn-based tactics video games
Video game sequels
Video games about microbes
Video games developed in the United Kingdom
Video games scored by John Broomhall
Video games set in the 2080s
Video games with isometric graphics
Windows games
XCOM
Mythos Games games